= Anastasios Sidiropoulos =

Greek football referee (born 1979)

Tasos Sidiropoulos
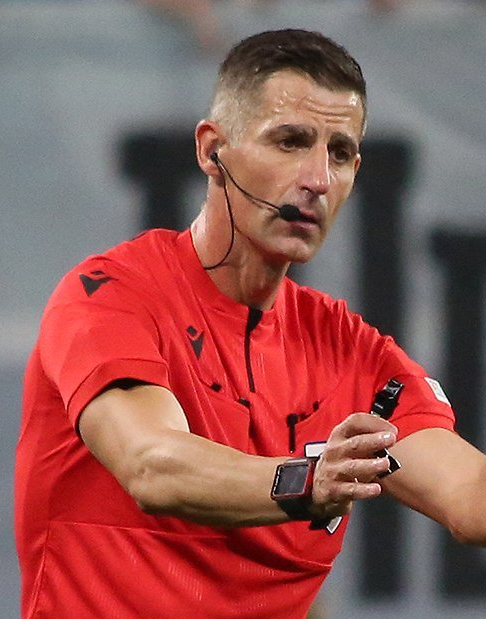
- Sidiropoulos in 2021
- Full name: Anastasios Sidiropoulos
- Born: 9 August 1979 (age 47); Greece

Domestic
Years	League	Role

International
Years	League	Role
2011–2024	FIFA listed	Referee

Anastasios "Tasos" Sidiropoulos (Greek: Αναστάσιος "Τάσος" Σιδηρόπουλος; born 9 August 1979) is a Greek football referee. He referees at UEFA Europa League from the 2013–14 season.
